The 2007 East Northamptonshire District Council election took place on 3 May 2007 to elect members of East Northamptonshire District Council in Northamptonshire, England. This was on the same day as other local elections. This was the first election to be held under new ward boundaries. The Conservative Party retained overall control of the council, while the Labour Party was wiped out, with a single Independent councillor providing the sole opposition.

References

2007 English local elections
2007
2000s in Northamptonshire